Ecstasy (September 1973) is the fourth studio album by the Ohio Players and the third released through the Westbound label.  The album was produced by the band, and arranged by Walter "Junie" Morrison.  The cover photo was taken by Joel Brodsky.

Track listing

Personnel
Walter "Junie" Morrison
Leroy "Sugarfoot" Bonner
Marshall "Rock" Jones
Ralph "Pee Wee" Middlebrooks
Bruce Napier
Marvin "Merv" Pierce 
Clarence "Satch" Satchell
James "Diamond" Williams

Production
Ohio Players – producers
Walter "Junie" Morrison – arrangements
David Krieger – art direction
Ron Canagata, The Graffiteria – designer
Joel Brodsky, Neil Terk – photography
Mia Krinsky – album co-ordination
Bob Scerbo – art production supervision

Charts

Singles

References

External links
 Ecstasy at Discogs

1973 albums
Ohio Players albums
Westbound Records albums
Albums with cover art by Joel Brodsky